Satu may refer to:

Geography
 Satu Mare, a town in northwest Romania
 SATU, a people mover in Portugal

Other
 Satu (name), a popular female given name in Finland
 Satu (Edward Vesala album), album by Finnish musician Edward Vesala 1976
 The number one (1) in the Indonesian and Malay languages
Satu (Noah, Nidji, Geisha & d'Masiv album), album by Indonesian bands Noah, Nidji, Geisha & d'Masiv 2015
Satu (Siti Nurhaliza concert), concert by Siti Nurhaliza

See also
 Satu Mare (disambiguation)